Viator is an academic peer-reviewed journal published by Brepols for the University of California, Los Angeles. It publishes scholarly articles on medieval and Renaissance studies, and increasingly focuses on articles addressing topics from late antiquity to early modernity. Founded in 1971 by Lynn Townsend White Jr., the journal published its 50th volume in 2020. In 2021, Viator adopted a new mission statement and assembled a new External Editorial Board. Also in 2021, longstanding editor Henry A. Kelly stepped down from his position.

The journal is housed at UCLA's CMRS Center for Early Global Studies.

Viator published a special issue in 2011, Medieval manuscripts, their makers and users : a special issue of Viator in honor of Richard and Mary Rouse, edited by Christopher Baswell (ISBN 9782503538945).

Further reading 
 H.A. Kelly, "Vale, Viator!"Viator 50:3 (2019), 1-6.
 M. Fisher, "Salve, Viator!" Viator 50:3 (2019), 7-11.
 J.Van Engen, "Reflections on the CMRS and Medieval Studies at the Founding of Viator," Viator 50:3 (2019), 11-24.

References 

 UCLA CMRS: Viator
 Brepols Publishers: Viator

Reviews of the journal's first issues:
 
 
 
 
 

History journals
Publications established in 1971
English-language journals
Brepols academic journals